Events from the year 1991 in Argentina

Incumbents
 President: Carlos Menem
 Vice president: Eduardo Duhalde

Governors
Governor of Buenos Aires Province: Antonio Cafiero (until 10 December); Eduardo Duhalde (from 10 December)
Governor of Catamarca Province: 
 until 17 April: Ramón Saadi 
 17 April-10 December: Luis Prol
 from 10 December: Arnoldo Castillo
Governor of Chaco Province: Danilo Baroni (until 10 December); Rolando Tauguinas (from 10 December)
Governor of Chubut Province: Fernando Cosentino then Carlos Maestro
Governor of Córdoba: Ricardo Guillermo Leconte
Governor of Corrientes Province: Ricardo Guillermo Leconte (until 10 December); Hugo Mancini (from 10 December)
Governor of Entre Ríos Province: Jorge Busti (until 11 December); Mario Moine (from 11 December)
Governor of Formosa Province: Vicente Joga 
Governor of Jujuy Province: Eduardo Alderete (until 10 December); Ricardo Domínguez (from 10 December)
Governor of La Pampa Province: Néstor Ahuad (until 10 December); Rubén Marín (from 10 December)
Governor of La Rioja Province: 
 until 4 July: Agustín de la Vega
 4 July-10 December: Luis Beder Herrera
 from 10 December: Bernabé Arnaudo
Governor of Mendoza Province: José Octavio Bordón (until 10 December); Rodolfo Gabrielli (from 10 December)
Governor of Misiones Province: Julio César Humada (until 10 December); Ramón Puerta (from 10 December)
Governor of Neuquén Province: Pedro Salvatori (until 10 December); Jorge Sobisch (from 10 December)
Governor of Río Negro Province: Horacio Massaccesi (until 10 December); Pablo Verani (from 10 December)
Governor of Salta Province: Hernán Cornejo (until 10 December); Roberto Ulloa (from 10 December)
Governor of San Juan Province: Carlos Enrique Gómez Centurión (until 10 December); Jorge Escobar (from 10 December)
Governor of San Luis Province: Adolfo Rodríguez Saá
Governor of Santa Cruz Province: 
 until 15 March: José Ramón Granero 
 15 March-10 December: Héctor Marcelino García
 from 10 December: Néstor Kirchner
Governor of Santa Fe Province: Víctor Reviglio (until 11 December); Carlos Reutemann (from 11 December)
Governor of Santiago del Estero: César Iturre (until 10 December); Carlos Aldo Mujica (from 10 December)
Governor of Tucumán: 
 until 18 January: José Domato
 18 January-29 October: Julio César Aráoz
 from 29 October: Ramón Bautista Ortega

Vice Governors
Vice Governor of Buenos Aires Province: Luis María Macaya (until 10 December); Rafael Romá (from 10 December)
Vice Governor of Catamarca Province: 
 until 17 April: Oscar Garbe 
 17 April-10 December: vacant
 from 10 December: Simón Hernández
Vice Governor of Chaco Province: Emilio Carrara (until 10 December); Luis Varisco (from 10 December)
Vice Governor of Corrientes Province: Gabriel Feris (until 10 December); vacant thereafter (from 10 December)
Vice Governor of Entre Rios Province: Domingo Daniel Rossi (until 10 December); Hernán Orduna (from 10 December)
Vice Governor of Formosa Province: Gildo Insfrán
Vice Governor of Jujuy Province: vacant (until 10 December); Carlos Ficoseco (from 10 December)
Vice Governor of La Pampa Province: Edén Cavallero (until 10 December); Manuel Baladrón (from 10 December)
Vice Governor of La Rioja Province: vacant (until 10 December); Luis Beder Herrera (from 10 December)
Vice Governor of Misiones Province: Julio Piró (until 10 December); Miguel Ángel Alterach (from 10 December)
Vice Governor of Nenquen Province: José Lucas Echegaray (until 10 December); Felipe Rodolfo Sapag (from 10 December)
Vice Governor of Rio Negro Province: Pablo Verani (until 10 December); Edgardo Gagliardi (from 10 December)
Vice Governor of Salta Province: Pedro de los Ríos (until 10 December); Ricardo Gómez Diez (from 10 December)
Vice Governor of San Juan Province: Wbaldino Acosta (until 10 December);  (from 10 December)
Vice Governor of San Luis Province: Ángel Rafael Ruiz (until 10 December); Bernardo Quincio (from 10 December)
Vice Governor of Santa Cruz: vacant thereafter (until 10 December); Eduardo Arnold (from 10 December)
Vice Governor of Santa Fe Province: Antonio Vanrell (until 10 December); Miguel Ángel Robles (from 10 December)
Vice Governor of Santiago del Estero: Manuel Hipólito Herrera (until 10 December); Fernando Martín Lobo (from 10 December)

Events
26 March - Argentina signs the Treaty of Asunción with Brazil, Uruguay and Paraguay, establishing the South Common Market (Mercosur).

Births
7 October - Brenda Asnicar, actress and singer
10 October - Lali Espósito, actress, singer, dancer and model
11 December - Gastón Soffritti, actor

Deaths
24 February - Héctor Rial, Argentinian footballer (born 1928)

See also

List of Argentine films of 1991

References

 
Years of the 20th century in Argentina
Argentina
1990s in Argentina
Argentina